Decodon is a genus of wrasses found in the western Atlantic Ocean, the western Indian Ocean and the Pacific Ocean.

Species
The currently recognized species in this genus are:
 Decodon grandisquamis (J. L. B. Smith, 1968) (largescale wrasse)
 Decodon melasma M. F. Gomon, 1974 (blackspot wrasse)
 Decodon pacificus (Kamohara, 1952) (ten-tooth wrasse)
 Decodon puellaris (Poey, 1860) (red hogfish)

References

Labridae
Marine fish genera
Taxa named by Albert Günther